Murray Fergus Muir (16 February 1928 – 5 October 2004) was a New Zealand cricketer. He played one first-class match for Otago in 1949/50.

On 12 March 1955, Muir married netball player and coach Lois Osborne, and the couple went on to have three children.

See also
 List of Otago representative cricketers

References

External links
 

1928 births
2004 deaths
New Zealand cricketers
Otago cricketers
Cricketers from Dunedin